BrowserStack is an Indian cloud web and mobile testing platform that provides developers with the ability to test their websites and mobile applications across on-demand browsers, operating systems and real mobile devices.

History 
The subscription-based service was founded by Ritesh Arora and Nakul Aggarwal in 2011 in Mumbai, India, and was originally started as a service to let developers test their websites on Internet Explorer. BrowserStack has over 25,000 paid customers and 2 million registered developers in more than 135 countries. 

In October 2015, BrowserStack was recognised as a Bootstrap Champ in The Economic Times Startup Awards.

BrowserStack has offices in San Francisco, Mumbai and Dublin. Privately held, the company raised $50 million Series A from Accel in 2018. 

In July 2020, BrowserStack announced that they had acquired Percy, a San Francisco-based visual testing software provider.

In June 2021, BrowserStack raised $200 million in a series B led by BOND and Insight Partners at a valuation of $4 billion.

In December 2021, BrowserStack announced acquisition of open source, end-to-end testing automation framework, Nightwatch.js.

Components 
BrowserStack have five primary products: Live, App Live, Automate, App Automate and Percy.

References

Load testing tools
Unit testing frameworks
Graphical user interface testing
Web development software